Knud Andersen may refer to:

 Knud Andersen (footballer, born 1900) (1900–1967), Danish footballer
 Knud Andersen (footballer, born 1917)
 Knud Andersen (cyclist) (1922–1997), Danish cyclist
 Knud Andersen (mammalogist) (1867–1918), Danish zoologist
 K. B. Andersen (1914–1984), Danish politician